Austin Watson (born September 4, 1986) is an American professional wrestler. He is currently signed to WWE, where he performs on the SmackDown brand under the ring name Xavier Woods. Watson also makes public appearances outside of wrestling under the name Austin Creed.

Watson previously worked for Total Nonstop Action Wrestling (TNA) as Consequences Creed, and was a one-time TNA World Tag Team Champion with Jay Lethal as The Lethal Consequences. After signing with WWE in 2010, he was assigned to its developmental territory Florida Championship Wrestling (FCW) under the ring name Xavier Woods. FCW was later closed and rebranded as NXT, where Woods worked until he was called up to the main roster in 2013. In 2014, Woods formed The New Day alongside Big E and Kofi Kingston, and has since become a record seven-time SmackDown Tag Team Champion, four-time Raw Tag Team Champion, and one-time NXT Tag Team Champion, making him an overall 12-time tag team champion in WWE. New Day's second reign with the Raw Tag Team Championship was the longest tag team title reign of any male tag team championship in WWE history until that record was broken in February 2021. In October 2021, Woods became the 22nd winner of the King of the Ring tournament and briefly went by the name of King Woods. With his NXT Tag Team Championship win in 2022, Woods also became a Tag Team Triple Crown Champion.

Since 2015, Watson, as Austin Creed, has hosted a gaming YouTube channel titled UpUpDownDown, where he invites fellow WWE performers, gaming personalities, friends, and guests to play games. He was also a host on the G4 television network, which covers video games, following its revival in 2020 until its end in 2022.

Early life 
Watson was born in Columbus, Georgia. He graduated from Sprayberry High School but there are also rumors that he graduated at Pebblebrook High School instead in 2004. Later that year, he began studying psychology and philosophy at Furman University in Greenville, South Carolina. He graduated with a master's degree in psychology and a bachelor's degree in philosophy.

Professional wrestling career

Early years (2005–2007) 
While attending Furman University, Watson began training for a career in professional wrestling and, in 2005, began wrestling part-time with Rob Adonis' Ultimate Christian Wrestling promotion. While in the Greenville, South Carolina-based World Wrestling Council, he developed his Austin Creed gimmick, which is based heavily on the character Apollo Creed from the Rocky series.

During his time in NWA Anarchy, Creed was part of a tag team called Awesome Attraction with Hayden Young. The pair had one of the longest title reigns in the promotion's history after defeating Justice Served (Jason Justice and Mike Free) in Cornelia, Georgia on April 7, 2007. In 2006, Creed won NWA's Most Popular Wrestler, voted for by the NWA fans.

In 2007, Watson took a day off from college to show up unannounced at the main building of Deep South Wrestling (DSW), then a developmental territory of WWE, and apply for a job as a wrestler; coincidentally, his future New Day partner Kofi Kingston (then using the ringname "Kofi Nahaje Kingston") was working in the ring the exact moment he arrived, marking the first meeting between the two. DSW accepted to give Creed a tryout, although WWE would officially cut ties with DSW shortly before he received a contract. On July 12, 2007, Creed defeated Murder-One in a tournament finals to win the vacant DSW Heavyweight Champion, becoming the first wrestler to hold the title without the company being affiliated with WWE; the company closed its doors the following October 11, making Creed the final DSW Heavyweight Champion.

Total Nonstop Action Wrestling (2007–2010)

X Division (2007–2008) 

Creed appeared at Total Nonstop Action Wrestling's Bound For Glory pay-per-view event, teaming with Ron Killings as the replacement for Adam "Pacman" Jones. Creed wrestled under the name Rasheed Lucius "Consequences" Creed. His union with Ron Killings was dubbed Truth and Consequences, which was a combination of Killings' nickname "The Truth" and Creed's nickname "Consequences" as well as a play on words on the game show of a similar name.

On October 21, 2007, it was reported that Creed had signed a contract with TNA. The signing was reported when Creed appeared on the radio show Trash Talking Radio on October 23 with Tommy Cairo and Sabian. His signing was also confirmed later at a NWA Anarchy show where Creed was presented with the contract by TNA Booking Director Bill Behrens. Following Bound For Glory, Creed was not seen on TNA television for months after Killings asked for and was later granted his release from the company.

On February 10, 2008, Creed wrestled in a dark match before Against All Odds. He teamed with Sonjay Dutt defeating The Rock 'n Rave Infection. On the March 13 episode of Impact!, a promo video with the words "prepare to face the consequences" showed Creed training and announced that he would make his return at the Lockdown pay-per-view on April 13. The following week, the return date was changed to April 10. On the April 10 episode of Impact!, Creed made his in-ring return and defeated Jimmy Rave of The Rock 'n Rave Infection, thus qualifying for the Xscape match at Lockdown. During the match, Creed eliminated Shark Boy, but was later eliminated by Curry Man. Creed later wrestled in the first ever TerrorDome match at Sacrifice, which was won by Kaz.

At Hard Justice, Creed faced Petey Williams for the X Division Championship, but lost after interference from Sheik Abdul Bashir. On the September 4, 2008, episode of Impact!, he won a number one contenders match against Bashir for the right to face Williams again at No Surrender for the X Division Title. However, the match was later changed to a triple threat after Bashir repeatedly attacked Creed and ultimately, Bashir won the match and the X Division title. At Bound for Glory IV on October 12, 2008, Creed was defeated by Bashir in another match for the X Division Championship.

Lethal Consequences (2008–2010) 

On the October 30, 2008, episode of Impact!, Creed, along with Samoa Joe, A.J. Styles, Jay Lethal, Petey Williams, Eric Young, ODB and The Motor City Machineguns formed a faction of younger wrestlers, known as The Frontline, to oppose The Main Event Mafia.

On January 8, 2009 (taped December 16, 2008), fellow Frontline member Lethal chose Creed to cash in his Feast or Fired briefcase with, and the pair won the World Tag Team Championship from the champions Beer Money, Inc. (Robert Roode and James Storm). Creed and Lethal went on to be named Lethal Consequences, a combination of their respective names. Beer Money, Inc. regained their titles in a three-way match at Genesis. at Against All Odds, Creed and Lethal got their rematch but failed to regain the titles.

For the next few months, Creed and Lethal teamed with the Motor City Machineguns to try and unmask Suicide. At Against All Odds, Lethal Consequences lost to Beer Money, Inc., At Destination X, Creed competed in an Ultimate X match for the TNA X Division Championship which was won by Suicide. At Lockdown, Creed competed in a Xscape match for the X Division Championship which was won by Suicide. At Sacrifice, Lethal Consequences and Eric Young defeated The Motor City Machine Guns (Alex Shelley and Chris Sabin) and Sheik Abdul Bashir. At Slammiversary, Creed competed in a King of the Mountain match for the X Division Championship which was won by Suicide. At Hard Justice, Creed competed in a Steel Asylum match which was won by Daniels.

On the October 1, 2009, episode of Impact!, Creed and Lethal were part of a 5-man ladder match for a future X Division Title match. During the match, Amazing Red, who ended up winning the match, performed a hurricanrana driver, which caused Creed to projectile vomit after his head hit the mat.

At Bound for Glory, Lethal Consequences (Consequences Creed and Jay Lethal) lost to The Motor City Machine Guns (Alex Shelley and Chris Sabin) on the preshow. at Final Resolution, Creed competed in a Feast or Fired match but failed to win the match.

Watson was released from TNA on March 29, 2010.

New Japan Pro-Wrestling (2010) 
On April 4, New Japan Pro-Wrestling (NJPW) announced Watson, under his Consequences Creed ring name, as a participant in the first Super J Tag Tournament. On May 8, Creed and his partner Kota Ibushi were eliminated from the tournament in the first round by the team of Gedo and Kushida. Creed returned to New Japan on June 28, 2010, teaming up with IWGP Heavyweight Champion Togi Makabe and Tomoaki Honma in the J Sports Crown Openweight 6 Man Tag Tournament. After defeating Tamon Honda, Kentaro Shiga and Makoto Hashi in the opening round, the trio was eliminated from the tournament in the second round by Shinsuke Nakamura, Masato Tanaka and Tomohiro Ishii.

On July 10, Creed defeated Brian Milonas, U-Gene and Tommaso Ciampa to win East Coast Wrestling Association's 2010 Super 8 Tournament.

World Wrestling Entertainment/WWE

Developmental territories (2010–2013) 
On July 22, 2010, it was announced that Watson had signed a developmental contract with World Wrestling Entertainment (WWE). In a 2016 interview, Watson revealed that he got hired by showing up unannounced to Florida Championship Wrestling (FCW), a developmental territory of WWE, to apply for a job as wrestler; his future New Day partner Kofi Kingston, who had coincidentally met him on the day Watson had similarly showed up in DSW in 2007, happened to be in the room yet again when Watson entered. WWE had originally wanted to sign Watson full-time, but as he had six months left before finishing college, he turned down the offer; instead, they agreed to let him work part-time until he graduated from college, and gave him a full-time contract afterwards.

Watson, using his real name, made his debut for FCW on July 29, 2010, in a tag team match, where he and Percy Watson were defeated by Brodus Clay and Donny Marlow. Following his debut, he was then added to FCW's official website under the name Xavier Woods. In October, Woods began to team up with Wes Brisco and they took part in a tag team turmoil match on October 14, where they defeated three other teams. On November 4, Woods and Brisco defeated Johnny Curtis and Derrick Bateman to become the Florida Tag Team Champions. On December 1, Woods and Brisco vacated the Tag Team Championship after Brisco was sidelined with an injury. With Brisco sidelined with an injury, Woods teamed up with Marcus Owens to take on Damien Sandow and Titus O'Neil for the vacant Florida Tag Team Championship, but were unsuccessful. Following this, Woods began performing as a singles competitor throughout 2011 and 2012, though without much success.

After WWE rebranded its developmental territory, FCW, into NXT, Woods made his televised debut on the October 31, 2012, episode of NXT with a loss to Leo Kruger. While picking up wins on NXT over the likes of El Local and Jake Carter, Woods began using the gimmick of a fanboy of 1990s popular culture that saw him implement his legitimate fandom of Mighty Morphin Power Rangers, Dragon Ball Z, and other 1990s pop culture into his matches and attire. He stopped using this gimmick once he was called up to WWE's main roster.

Teaming with R-Truth (2013–2014) 

On the November 18, 2013, episode of Raw, Woods made his main roster debut as he teamed with fellow TNA alumnus and former tag-team partner R-Truth to defeat 3MB (Drew McIntyre and Jinder Mahal). The following week on Raw, Woods defeated Heath Slater in his singles debut match while being accompanied by R-Truth and The Funkadactyls (Naomi and Cameron). On the November 29 episode of SmackDown, Woods began a feud with Brodus Clay, after Clay took offense to Woods using his entrance music and The Funkdactyls as his valets. Later that night, Woods suffered his first loss when he and R-Truth lost to Tons of Funk (Clay and Tensai). On the December 2 episode of Raw, Woods and Truth defeated Tons of Funk in a rematch. On the December 9 episode of Raw, Woods lost to Clay. On the December 11 episode of Main Event, Woods and Truth defeated Tons of Funk to end the feud.

On April 6, 2014, Woods made his WrestleMania debut at WrestleMania XXX, where he competed in the André the Giant Memorial Battle Royal, but failed to win the match. Woods and Truth then began a feud with the debuting Alexander Rusev, and were defeated by him in singles encounters. At Extreme Rules, Woods and Truth was defeated by Rusev in a handicap match. After that loss, Woods and Truth's team quietly disbanded.

The New Day (2014–present) 

On the July 21 episode of Raw, after Big E and Kofi Kingston suffered another loss as a team in a recent string of defeats, Woods came down to address them. He went on to state that they could not "get ahead by kissing babies and shaking hands" and that now is "their time" and offered to form a stable. The duo accepted Woods' offer, and on the next day's Main Event, Woods managed Big E and Kingston to a decisive victory over Heath Slater and Titus O'Neil. On the July 29 episode of Main Event, Woods filled a commentary role while he and his group observed a match wrestled by the WWE Tag Team Champions, The Usos. The trio then temporarily separated as on the August 8 episode of SmackDown, both Big E and Kingston reverted to wrestling singles matches with no sign or mention of the other two members of the group. Woods also joined the broadcast team alongside Rich Brennan on August 28 episode of Superstars. Despite being disbanded on WWE television; Woods, Big E, and Kingston continued their alliance at house shows. On the September 26 episode of SmackDown, Woods competed in an Intercontinental Championship No. 1 contender battle royal, which was won by Cesaro.

From the November 3 episode of Raw, WWE began airing vignettes for Woods, Big E, and Kingston, with the stable billed as The New Day, and presented as overly-positive babyface characters. The New Day made their in-ring debut on the November 28 episode of SmackDown in a winning effort against Curtis Axel, Heath Slater, and Titus O'Neil. They started a brief feud with Gold and Stardust, which Kingston and Big E defeated Gold and Stardust at the TLC: Tables, Ladders & Chairs pre-show on December 14. At WrestleMania 31, Woods competed in the André the Giant Memorial Battle Royal, where he was eliminated by eventual winner, Big Show.

On the April 6, 2015, episode of Raw, The New Day turned heel, after fans responded negatively to the group. During this time, Woods especially would trash-talk with their opponents and the crowd during matches. On the April 20 episode of Raw, The New Day defeated The Lucha Dragons via countout to become the number one contenders for the WWE Tag Team Championship, after Woods held onto Sin Cara's feet to prevent him from re-entering the ring. At Extreme Rules, Big E and Kingston defeated Tyson Kidd and Cesaro to win the WWE Tag Team Championship, after a distraction from Woods. Woods was then given a share of the title and the trio defended the titles under the Freebird Rule. Big E and Kingston retained titles against Kidd and Cesaro on SmackDown and at Payback, with Woods interfering in both matches. At Elimination Chamber, The New Day retained the title in the first ever tag team Elimination Chamber match, where all three members were allowed to compete. At Money in the Bank, Woods and Big E lost the titles to The Prime Time Players (Titus O'Neil and Darren Young), but regain the titles at SummerSlam for the second time. The next night on Raw, The New Day were attacked by returning The Dudley Boyz, which ended with Woods being put through a table with a 3D. The New Day retained the titles against The Dudley Boyz at Night of Champions and Live from Madison Square Garden events by disqualification, and at Hell in a Cell by pinfall. The New Day retained the championship at TLC in a triple threat tag team ladder match against The Lucha Dragons and The Usos. They retained their title against The Usos at Royal Rumble.

Despite portraying heels, New Day's strong in-ring performances and entertaining segments garnered positive reactions from critics and live audiences and the trio turned face after mocking The League of Nations (Sheamus, Alberto Del Rio, King Barrett, and Rusev), as the crowd was starting to get behind them. The New Day retained the titles at Roadblock, after defeating Sheamus and King Barrett, but lost against them at WrestleMania 32 in a six-man tag team match. The New Day then retained their championship at Extreme Rules against The Vaudevillains and at the Money in the Bank against The Vaudevillains, Enzo Amore and Big Cass and Luke Gallows and Karl Anderson in a fatal four-way tag team match. On July 19, Woods, along with his fellow The New Day teammates, was drafted to Raw brand as part of WWE draft. On July 22, The New Day became the longest reigning WWE Tag Team Champions in history, breaking the record of 478 days previously set by Demolition. After SmackDown established the SmackDown Tag Team Championship after the brand split, the titles held by The New Day were renamed the Raw Tag Team Championship. They retained the titles against Gallows and Anderson at SummerSlam and Clash of Champions. On the October 31 episode of Raw, The New Day revealed that they were made captain of Team Raw for the Survivor Series tag team elimination match at Survivor Series. At the event, they were the first team eliminated although Team Raw still went on to win the match. On the November 21 episode of Raw, The New Day successfully retained their titles against Team Raw's sole survivors, Cesaro and Sheamus. At Roadblock: End of the Line, The New Day lost the Raw Tag Team Championship to Cesaro and Sheamus, ending their record-breaking championship reign at 483 days. The New Day then received a rematch, but failed to reclaim the championships. The New Day would then go on to host WrestleMania 33.

On April 11, 2017, The New Day were moved to the SmackDown brand as part of the Superstar Shake-up. They started a feud with The Usos, facing them for the SmackDown Tag Team Championship at Money in the Bank, which they won by countout. At Battleground, Woods and Kingston defeated The Usos to win the SmackDown Tag Team Championship for the first time, but lost the titles back to The Usos at SummerSlam. On the September 12 episode of SmackDown Live, The New Day defeated The Usos to win back the championship in a Sin City Street Fight, but lost them again to The Usos at Hell in a Cell. The New Day failed to regain the titles from The Usos at Clash of Champions in a fatal four-way tag team match also involving the team of Chad Gable and Shelton Benjamin, and Aiden English and Rusev. On the December 26 episode of SmackDown Live, general manager Daniel Bryan revealed a tournament for the vacant United States Championship. In this tournament, Woods defeated Aiden English in the first round, but lost to Jinder Mahal in the semi-finals. On January 28, 2018, Woods entered the Royal Rumble match at number 12, but was eliminated by Mahal. At Fastlane, The New Day faced The Usos for the Smackdown Tag Team Championship, but went to a no contest after inference from The Bludgeon Brothers. At WrestleMania 34, The New Day would face The Usos and The Bludgeon Brothers in a triple threat tag team match for the SmackDown Tag Team Championships, but failed to capture the titles. On July 21, general manager Paige scheduled a tag team title tournament, with the winning team earning the right to challenge The Bludgeon Brothers for the SmackDown Tag Team Championship at SummerSlam. The New Day defeated SAnitY in the semi-finals and Cesaro and Sheamus in the finals. At SummerSlam, The New Day won the match by disqualification, meaning The Bludgeon Brothers retained their titles, but two days later on SmackDown Live, The New Day defeated The Bludgeon Brothers in a no disqualification match to capture the titles for a third time. On October 16, Woods and Big E lost the titles against The Bar on SmackDown 1000.

On January 27, 2019, at Royal Rumble, Woods entered the Royal Rumble match, but was eliminated by Drew McIntyre. In the lead-up to WrestleMania 35, Woods's teammate Kofi Kingston was attempting to earn a shot at the WWE Championship and after many attempts, Mr. McMahon granted him the title shot after Woods and Big E defeated Gallows and Anderson, Rusev and Shinsuke Nakamura, The Bar, The Usos, and Daniel Bryan and Rowan in a tag team gauntlet match. Following WrestleMania, Woods and Big E later earned another SmackDown Tag Team Championship opportunity at Extreme Rules. At the event, Woods and Big E defeated Daniel Bryan and Rowan, and Heavy Machinery to win the titles. Woods and Big E lost the titles to The Revival at Clash of Champions. During a WWE live event on October 21, Woods suffered a legitimate achilles injury and it was reported that the injury would sideline him for six months to a year.

On the October 9, 2020, episode of SmackDown, Woods returned from injury, where he teamed with Kingston to defeat Cesaro and Shinsuke Nakamura, winning their seventh SmackDown Tag Team Championship. After the match, as part of the 2020 Draft, Kingston and Woods were drafted to the Raw brand, splitting them from Big E, who remained on the SmackDown brand. On the October 12 episode of Raw, New Day would exchange tag team titles with Raw Tag Team Championship holders The Street Profits, who were drafted to SmackDown. This would mark Kingston and Woods' third reign with the Raw titles as a team (fifth for Kingston individually), New Day's 10th tag team championship reign in WWE as a team, and Woods' 10th tag team championship reign individually. On December 20, at TLC, Kingston and Woods lost the Raw Tag Team Championship to The Hurt Business (Cedric Alexander and Shelton Benjamin). Woods and Kingston then would win back the titles from Alexander and Benjamin on March 15, 2021, during the live broadcast of Raw, marking Woods' fourth reign with the Raw Tag Titles, and overall 11th Tag Team Championship reign in WWE. They would hold the championship until WrestleMania 37 where they lost the titles to AJ Styles and Omos.

As part of the 2021 Draft, Woods – along with his tag team partner Kingston – were drafted to the SmackDown brand, which took effect on October 22. Before that, Woods entered the 2021 King of the Ring tournament, representing Raw, where he defeated Ricochet in the first round and Jinder Mahal in the semi-finals. At Crown Jewel on October 21, Woods defeated SmackDown's Finn Bálor in the final to win the tournament and become "King of the Ring"; his first individual accolade in WWE. On the following episode of SmackDown, with the team now officially members of the SmackDown brand, The New Day had a coronation for Woods. Kingston introduced Woods and adorned him with a cape, crown, and scepter, and Woods' ring name was changed to King Woods. On the January 14, 2022 edition of SmackDown, Woods was diagnosed with a torn plantaris, rendering him unable to compete for 4–6 weeks.

On the March 25, 2022 edition of SmackDown, Woods made his return reverting to Xavier Woods defeating Ridge Holland in a match. Kingston & Woods then challenged Sheamus & Ridge Holland to a match at WrestleMania, but lost.

On December 10, at Deadline, Woods and Kingston defeated Pretty Deadly (Elton Prince and Kit Wilson) to win NXT Tag Team Championship for the first time and also the third WWE Tag Team Triple Crown winners by winning NXT Tag Titles.

Other media

Woods's wrestling persona is playable in eight video games: TNA Impact!: Cross the Line as Consequences Creed, and in WWE 2K15, WWE 2K16, WWE 2K17, WWE 2K18, WWE 2K19, WWE 2K20, WWE 2K22, and as a crossover character in Brawlhalla, as Xavier Woods. In addition, Woods appears in Super Bomberman R and as a costume in Fall Guys. Under the Xavier Woods moniker, he played Mortal Kombat's Raiden in NetherRealm Studio's mobile game, WWE Immortals.

Woods's life was spotlighted, along with Adam Rose and Corey Graves, on ESPN's E:60 special on WWE titled "Behind the Curtain", which aired May 5, 2015. He made an appearance in fellow wrestler Emma's short-lived YouTube cooking channel Taste of Tenille in 2015. Woods was featured playing tambourine and trombone on the Postmodern Jukebox cover of "What is Love" music video.

In 2017, Woods made his voice acting debut as the character Vincent Mensah in the PlayStation 4 video game 2064: Read Only Memories. He also published The Book of Booty: Shake It. Love It. Never Be It with fellow New Day members Big E and Kofi Kingston.

In 2015, Woods, under his Austin Creed moniker, started a YouTube channel called UpUpDownDown, where he invites fellow WWE performers, gaming personalities, friends, and guests to play games. In August 2018, it won a Guinness World Record for Most Subscribed-to Celebrity Video Gaming Channel, with 1.6 million subscribers.

Woods is a recurring cast member of Penny Arcade's live Dungeons & Dragons campaign Acquisitions Incorporated as of 2019. He performs at various PAX conventions playing the role of Bobby Zimmeruski, a Goliath Barbarian with an obsession for violence and a deep love of cheese.
Watson, along with Big E and Kofi Kingston, appeared in an episode of Adam Ruins Everything where they did a rendition of their catchphrase during a segment about Mount Rushmore.

In February 2020, Woods announced his partnership with Riot Games to create Esports experiences.

In November 2020, Woods, alongside fellow The New Day members Big E and Kingston, was added as playable DLC characters in the video game Gears 5, sporting custom armour in the colors of The New Day's ring attires; the three recorded dialogue specifically for the game.

On November 24, 2020, Woods was announced as one of the new hosts for the revival of G4.

Film

Personal life 
Watson has two bachelor's degrees in psychology and philosophy, a master's in psychology, and as of 2015, announced that he is currently working towards earning a PhD in educational psychology from Capella University.

Watson is an avid fan of video games. He has a tattoo of the Wingcrest from The Legend of Zelda series on his left forearm. He also has a Twitch account under the username AustinCreed. He won the annual WWE 2K tournament in 2015.

Watson married Jess Watson in 2015 and their son was born in 2017.

Championships and accomplishments 

 Deep South Wrestling
 DSW Heavyweight Championship (1 time)
 East Coast Wrestling Association
 ECWA Super 8 Tournament Champion (2010)
 Florida Championship Wrestling
 FCW Florida Tag Team Championship (1 time) – with Wes Brisco
 NWA Anarchy
 NWA Anarchy Tag Team Championship (1 time) – with Hayden Young
 Most Popular Wrestler (2006)
 Pro Wrestling Illustrated
 Tag Team of the Year (2015, 2016) 
 Ranked No. 58 of the top 500 singles wrestlers in the PWI 500 in 2016
 Ranked No. 8 of the top 50 tag teams in the PWI Tag Team 50 in 2020 
 Total Nonstop Action Wrestling
 TNA World Tag Team Championship (1 time) – with Jay Lethal
 Wrestling Observer Newsletter
Best Gimmick (2015) – The New Day
 WWE
WWE Raw Tag Team Championship (4 times)  – with Big E and Kofi Kingston (2), and Kofi Kingston (2)
 WWE SmackDown Tag Team Championship (7 times)  – with Big E and Kofi Kingston (6), and Kofi Kingston (1)
NXT Tag Team Championship (1 time) – with Kofi Kingston
 Third Tag Team Triple Crown Champion – with Kofi Kingston
 King of the Ring (2021)
 WWE SmackDown Tag Team Championship Tournament (2018) – with Big E and Kofi Kingston
WWE Year-End Award (1 time)
 Men's Tag Team of the Year (2019) – with Big E and Kofi Kingston
 Slammy Award (1 time)
 Ring Gear of the Year (2020) – with Big E and Kofi Kingston

Notes

References

External links 
 
 

 
 Xavier Woods on YouTube
 

1986 births
21st-century professional wrestlers
African-American male professional wrestlers
American male professional wrestlers
American sportspeople of Ghanaian descent
American YouTubers
FCW Florida Tag Team Champions
Living people
Professional wrestlers from Georgia (U.S. state)
Sportspeople from Marietta, Georgia
TNA/Impact World Tag Team Champions
WWF/WWE King Crown's Champions/King of the Ring winners